The 2024 IIHF World Championship will be hosted by Czechia from 10 to 26 May 2024. This decision was made at the semi-annual International Ice Hockey Federation (IIHF) congress, which is now held in Malta, on 24 May 2019 in Bratislava, Slovakia. Officially, this was announced on 12 September 2020, by the IIHF due to the COVID-19 pandemic.

Venues

Participants 
 (qualified as host)

References 

2024 Men
2024 in ice hockey
Scheduled ice hockey competitions